Squamigera is a genus of nicoletiids in the family Nicoletiidae.

References

Further reading

 
 

Insect genera
Articles created by Qbugbot